The Aralkum Desert is a desert that has appeared since 1960 on the seabed once occupied by the Aral Sea. It lies to the south and east of what remains of the Eastern Basin Aral Sea in Uzbekistan and Kazakhstan. It is currently the youngest desert in the world.

History

While the level of the Aral Sea has fluctuated over its existence, the most recent level drop since the 1960s was caused by the Soviet Union building massive irrigation projects in the region. The severely reduced inflow caused the water level in the Aral Sea to drop. While the North Aral Sea rose due to the Dike Kokaral, the South Aral Sea kept dropping, thus expanding the size of the desert, until 2010, when the South Aral Sea was partly reflooded. The water level of the South Aral Sea then began to drop again, this time more severely.

In August 2021, British polar athlete Rosie Stancer led the first expedition on foot across the Aralkum desert.

Stranded boats 
Before its desertification, the Aral Sea sustained a large fishing industry that provided up to one-sixth of the Soviet Union's fish. As the water receded, many fishing vessels and other boats were left behind in the desert. In the former port of the city of Moʻynoq, rusting vessels have become a tourist attraction and the site of the Stihia Festival, Central Asia's largest electronic music festival.

Airborne contaminants

The sands of the Aralkum and the dust that originates from it contain pollutants. The desert's location is on a powerful west–east airstream that carries its polluted dust around the globe. Aral dust has been found in the fields of Belarus, the forests of Norway, and in the glaciers of Greenland. Pesticides in the dust have been found in the blood of penguins in Antarctica.

See also
Desertification
List of environmental disasters

References

External links 

Siegmar-W. Breckle: Combating desertification and rehabilitation of the salt deserts in the region at the Aral Sea
Walter Wucherer: Primary succession on the dry sea floor of the Aral Sea

Deserts of Central Asia
Deserts of Kazakhstan
Deserts of Uzbekistan
Desertification
Aral Sea